Until statehood in 1889, Washington Territory elected a non-voting Delegate to the United States House of Representatives, at-large.

List of delegates representing the district

References 

 Congressional Biographical Directory of the United States 1774–present
 

Territory
Former congressional districts of the United States
At-large United States congressional districts